The Relic  is a role-playing iOS game developed by British company Clickgamer.com and was released on April 14, 2011.

Critical reception
The game received negative reviews, garnering a Metacritic score of 33% based on 4 critic ratings.

AppSmile said "Despite a recent update that fixed that control issues that plagued its initial launch, The Relic remains a sub-par title that lacks both realistic animations and a sense of enjoyment that would compel us to keep playing. " AppSpy wrote " Despite having a long, rich history supporting the Action-RPG, The Relic strikes out on its own and manages to get lost in the wilderness in the process; hold off on this one till updates address its core gameplay. " PocketGamerUK said " Although its control problems do much to limit its appeal, The Relic equally suffers from a clichéd plot, samey combat and uninspiring gameplay. " Modojo surmised " As for the game, well, it's god-awful. "

References

2011 video games
Android (operating system) games
IOS games
Role-playing video games
Video games developed in the United Kingdom